The New Bazaar is a neighbourhood in Tirana, Albania. The name of the neighbourhood stems from the groceries marketplace (the bazaar, in ), which is situated in the area. It is located east of the central boulevard. Along with Mujos it forms part of the Old Town of Tirana and is one of the oldest areas of the city. The old historic Kokonozi Mosque of Ottoman times is situated here.

The market offers a variety of fresh fruits, vegetables grown locally in the surrounding areas of Tirana, fish and meat, regional Albanian wine and raki. Many colorful buildings, restaurants and bakeries are surrounded. Recently, there have been a raising interest to make the Bazaar a touristic attraction. However in 2017, the bazaar were renovated and reconstructed.

The New Bazaar was built, before the reconstruction of 2016, in 1931 at the same place where the historic Old Bazaar were built, the latter extending up to present day Skanderbeg Square.

References

External links 
Official Instagram

Bazaars
Neighbourhoods of Tirana